The 2023 Nigerian Senate elections in Borno State will be held on 25 February 2023, to elect the 3 federal Senators from Borno State, one from each of the state's three senatorial districts. The elections will coincide with the 2023 presidential election, as well as other elections to the Senate and elections to the House of Representatives; with state elections being held two weeks later. Primaries were held between 4 April and 9 June 2022.

Background
In the previous Senate elections, two of the three incumbent senators were returned with APC senators Abubakar Kyari (North) and Mohammed Ali Ndume (South) winning re-election but Baba Kaka Bashir Garbai (APC-Central) retired. In the Central district, Kashim Shettima retained the seat for the APC with 81% of the vote; Kyari was re-elected with 68% in the North district while Ndume won with 76% in the South district. These results were a part of an APC sweep of Borno elections as both Buhari and gubernatorial nominee Babagana Umara Zulum won the state by wide margins and every single legislative seat in the House of Representatives and State House of Assembly levels were carried by APC nominees.

In April 2022, Kyari resigned from the Senate to focus on his new position as APC Deputy National Chairman (North) while in June of the same year, Shettima was picked as the APC vice presidential nominee.

Overview

Summary

Borno Central 

The Borno Central district covers the local government areas of Bama, Dikwa, Jere, Kaga, Kala/Balge, Konduga, Mafa, Maiduguri, and Ngala. The incumbent Kashim Shettima (APC), who was elected with 80.9% of the vote in 2019, initially sought re-election and was renominated by his party but withdrew from the nomination to become the APC nominee for vice president.

Primary elections

All Progressives Congress 

Shettima was renominated unopposed in the primary at the state APC secretariat in Maiduguri. However, in the weeks after the primary, Shettima was named by pundits as a potential vice presidential running mate for APC presidential nominee Bola Tinubu. These rumours were confirmed on 10 July when Tinubu announced Shettima as his running mate. After Shettima relinquished his senatorial nomination, a new primary was held in Maiduguri with Kaka Shehu Lawan—the former state Attorney-General and Commissioner of Justice—winning unopposed. In his acceptance speech, Lawan thanked Governor Babagana Umara Zulum, hailed Shettima, and vowed to properly represent the district.

People's Democratic Party 

Although Jibrin Mustapha Tatabe won the initial primary, former MHR Mohammed Umara Kumalia's name was listed as nominee amid an alleged substitution plot. In response, the APC went to court to challenge Umara Kumalia's candidacy leading to a early January 2023 ruling from Federal High Court judge Jude K. Dagat that barred Umara Kumalia from the nomination due to his illegal nominating process. However, the decision was overturned by a Court of Appeal ruling a few days before the election.

General election

Results

Borno North 

The Borno North district covers the local government areas of Abadam, Gubio, Guzamala, Kukawa, Magumeri, Marte, Mobbar, Monguno, and Nganzai. The seat is vacant as Senator Abubakar Kyari (APC), who was elected with 67.7% of the vote in 2019, resigned from the Senate on 12 April 2022 to focus on his new position as APC Deputy National Chairman (North). Despite a constitutional stipulation that by-elections must be held after a vacancy, INEC did not schedule a by-election amid its preparations for prescheduled elections in 2022 and 2023.

Primary elections

All Progressives Congress 

On the primary date, Mohammed Tahir Monguno—MHR for Monguno/Marte/Nganzai—was the sole candidate and was nominated unopposed at the primary.

People's Democratic Party

General election

Results

Borno South 

The Borno South district covers the local government areas of Askira/Uba, Bayo, Biu, Chibok, Damboa, Gwoza, Hawul, Kwaya Kusar, and Shani. The incumbent Mohammed Ali Ndume (APC), who was re-elected with 75.5% of the vote in 2019, is seeking re-election.

Primary elections

All Progressives Congress 

On the primary date, Ndume was the sole candidate and was nominated unopposed at the primary.

People's Democratic Party

Campaign
Campaign analysis from December 2022 pointed out Satumari's focus on power rotation as only natives of Gwoza had occupied the senate seat since the return of democracy in 1999; for the APC, pundits noted Ndume's longtime political power and electoral history.

General election

Results

See also 
 2023 Nigerian Senate election
 2023 Nigerian elections

Notes

References 

Borno State senatorial elections
2023 Borno State elections
Borno State Senate elections